Copainalá is a town and one of the 119 Municipalities of Chiapas, in southern Mexico. It covers an area of 330.4 km².

As of 2010, the municipality had a total population of 21,050, up from 19,298 as of 2005.

As of 2010, the town of Copainalá had a population of 6,550. Other than the town of Copainalá, the municipality had 174 localities, the largest of which (with 2010 populations in parentheses) were: Ángel Albino Corzo (Guadalupe) (1,469), and Benito Juárez (1,153), classified as rural.

The Copainalá Zoque dialect is spoken, in addition to Spanish.

References

External links

Copainalá Zoque 

OLAC resources in and about the Copainalá Zoque language

Municipalities of Chiapas